Roaring Rails is a 1924 American silent Western film directed by Tom Forman and featuring Harry Carey.

Cast
 Harry Carey as Big Bill Benson
 Frankie Darro as Little Bill
 Edith Roberts as Nora Burke
 Wallace MacDonald as Malcolm Gregory
 Frank Hagney as Red Burley
 Duke R. Lee as John McFarlane

Preservation
A complete print of Roaring Rails held by George Eastman House had its restoration funded by the National Film Preservation Foundation in 2010. On December 14, 2011, Turner Classic Movies aired this restored film.

See also
 Harry Carey filmography

References

External links

1924 films
American silent feature films
American black-and-white films
1920s action films
Films directed by Tom Forman
Producers Distributing Corporation films
Silent American Western (genre) films
Silent action films
1920s English-language films
1920s American films